Taşsu is a rural locality (a derevnya) in Biektaw District, Tatarstan. The population was 101 as of 2010.
Taşsu is located 30 km northwest of Biektaw, district's administrative centre, and 57 km north of Qazan, republic's capital, by road.

The earliest known record of the settlement dates from the 17th century. Its name derived from words taş (stone) and su (water). It forms part of the district since 1965.

There are 3 streets in the village.

The village is a birthplace of Sadri Maqsudi, a politician, and his brother , linguist and journalist.

References

External links 
 

Rural localities in Vysokogorsky District